Nordbotn may refer to:

Places
Nordbotn, Troms, a village in Tromsø municipality in Troms county, Norway
Nordbotn, Trøndelag, a village in Hitra municipality in Trøndelag county, Norway
Nordbotn Church, a church in Hitra municipality in Trøndelag county, Norway